The discography of Mexican recording artist Gloria Trevi consists of eleven studio albums, four live albums and seventy singles. Her first album as a solo artist, ¿Qué Hago Aquí?, was released in 1989 by Sony Music. With the same label she released four more albums: Tu Ángel de la Guarda in 1990, Me Siento Tan Sola in 1992, Más Turbada Que Nunca in 1994 and Si Me Llevas Contigo in 1995, which had generally positive commercial success in Mexico and some countries in Latin America. Her first two albums have sold a combined total of 5,750,000 copies, while her third effort sold 200,000 copies according to Billboard as of November 1992. After a break of more than a decade she released six more studio albums; all got at least a Gold certification in Mexico. By 2004, she had sold 15 million copies worldwide. Since then, her worldwide sales are around 35 million records.

Albums

Studio albums

Live albums

Compilation albums 
 1993: Cántalo tú mismo (BMG Ariola)
 1997: ¡De pelos! Lo mejor de la Trevi (BMG Ariola)
 1999: No soy monedita de oro (BMG Ariola) (I am not a gold digger)
 2008: Una Rosa Blu (Deluxe Edition) (Universal)
 2009: Lo escencial de Gloria Trevi (Sony Music)
 2009: 6 Super Hits (Universal)
Sources:

Singles (U.S. Billboard Hot Latin Songs)

As featured artist

References 

Discographies of Mexican artists
Latin pop music discographies
Rock music discographies